Seo Hye-jin (born 27 October 1985) is a South Korean former field hockey player. She competed in the women's tournament at the 2008 Summer Olympics.

References

External links
 

1985 births
Living people
South Korean female field hockey players
Olympic field hockey players of South Korea
Field hockey players at the 2008 Summer Olympics
Place of birth missing (living people)
20th-century South Korean women
21st-century South Korean women